Robert P. Hausinger is an American microbiologist, well-cited in his field, currently at Michigan State University and an Elected Fellow of the American Society for Microbiology.

References

Year of birth missing (living people)
Living people
Michigan State University faculty
American microbiologists
Place of birth missing (living people)